Postia tephroleuca, also known as greyling bracket, is a species of fungus in the family Fomitopsidaceae infecting broad-leaved trees, typically beech and plane.

References

Fungi described in 1821
Fungal plant pathogens and diseases
Fomitopsidaceae
Taxa named by Elias Magnus Fries